Rabbi Yehudah Jacobs (c. 1935 – April 27, 2020) was a mashgiach ruchani in Beth Medrash Govoha, the largest yeshiva located outside of Israel and the second to largest yeshiva in the world, second only to the Mir Yeshiva in Jerusalem.

Biography
Rabbi Jacobs was born about 1935 to R' Asher and Esther Jacobs in Cologne, Germany. He learned in Beth Medrash Govoha in Lakewood Township, New Jersey arriving in the late 1950s during its earlier years under the leadership of Rabbi Aharon Kotler. He married his first wife, Mrs. Ruthie, and settled in Lakewood together. He soon was appointed the mashgiach of Beth Medrash Govoha alongside Rabbi Nosson Meir Wachtfogel, a position he held for many years. After the passing of his first wife (c. 1985), Rabbi Jacobs married his second wife, Mrs. Esther. In 2010, he moved to Israel, where he stayed for a few years, all the while keeping up with the Lakewood Yeshiva. He later returned to Lakewood.

Rabbi Jacobs was known in Beth Medrash Govoha for the thousands of vaadim he gave to students, both before and after their marriages, where he gave advice on shidduchim and shalom bayis. Students sought after his advice in these areas. It was said that he was "the greatest and most legendary shadchan" and that "he was the wisest of men."

On April 27, 2020, after a month long battle with COVID-19, Rabbi Jacobs died in Lakewood. He is survived by children, grandchildren, and great-grandchildren.

References

1940s births
2020 deaths
Year of birth uncertain
American Haredi rabbis
American people of German-Jewish descent
Mashgiach ruchani
Deaths from the COVID-19 pandemic in New Jersey
Rabbis from New Jersey
Beth Medrash Govoha
People from Lakewood Township, New Jersey
People from Cologne